One Financial Plaza is a 374 ft (114 m), 28-story building in downtown Fort Lauderdale, Florida, USA, was opened in 1972. At the time of its opening, it was the tallest building in the Fort Lauderdale area. It has since been surpassed by several buildings. Currently, it is the city's sixth tallest building.

One Financial Plaza bears a striking resemblance to the Chase Tower in Amarillo, Texas. They were built around the same time (Chase Tower opened in 1971, the year before One Financial Plaza opened) and Chase Tower is only a few floors taller, at 31 stories.

History
When the building was constructed in 1972, it was known as the Landmark Bank Building, after its builder and main tenant, Landmark Bank. Landmark Bank was acquired by C&S in 1985 and, after a series of mergers and acquisitions, became a part of Bank of America. In 2002, Bank of America moved into a nearby building, and Union Planters Bank moved into the building the following year. The name on the building was changed to "Union Planters" and later to "Regions" when Regions Bank merged with Union Planters in 2004.

In 2005, when Hurricane Wilma hit Fort Lauderdale, One Financial Plaza (along with the rest of the city's skyline) suffered some damage, including a large gash that stretched from the 14th to the 19th floors. In 2009, construction was completed to rebuild a storm-grade curtain wall and modernize the facade in accordance with post-Hurricane Andrew building codes.

The renovation to fix the facade after the damage done by Hurricane Wilma was performed by RLC Architects from Boca Raton.

See also
List of tallest buildings in Fort Lauderdale

References

External links
One Financial Plaza website

Skyscrapers in Fort Lauderdale, Florida
Skyscraper office buildings in Florida
Office buildings completed in 1972
1972 establishments in Florida